Tru was a French restaurant located in the Streeterville neighborhood in Chicago. Tru was opened in 1999 by Rick Tramonto and Gale Gand with the backing of Rich Melman's Lettuce Entertain You Enterprises. It was a Michelin one-star restaurant since the Chicago guidebook's inception in 2011; in 2017 the restaurant was awarded two Michelin stars. Since 2008, the Executive Chef was Anthony Martin.
The restaurant closed on October 7, 2017.

Awards and accolades
The restaurant received a Michelin Star from the Michelin Guide every year since Chicago's debut guide in 2011, and two Michelin stars in 2017.  In 2013, Tru was once again awarded 5 diamonds from the American Automobile Association. Since 2004, the restaurant has been a recipient of the Wine Spectator Grand Award.

On September 5, 2017, Lettuce Entertain You Enterprises announced Tru would be serving its last service on Saturday, October 7, 2017.

See also
 List of French restaurants

References

Michelin Guide starred restaurants in Illinois
Defunct restaurants in Chicago
French-American culture in Illinois
Restaurants established in 1999
Restaurants disestablished in 2017
1999 establishments in Illinois
2017 disestablishments in Illinois
Defunct French restaurants in the United States
French restaurants in Illinois
European restaurants in Chicago